Daniel Audette (born May 6, 1996) is a Canadian professional ice hockey centre who is currently playing with Lausanne HC in the National League (NL).

Playing career

Minor
Audette was drafted in the 2012 QMJHL Bantam Draft by the inaugural Sherbrooke Phoenix. During his four seasons with the team, he amassed 237 points, setting the franchise record for most goals, assists, and points. After his rookie season, he competed in the Ivan Hlinka Memorial Tournament, where he won gold with Team Canada.

Audette was subsequently drafted in the fifth round, 147th overall, by the Montreal Canadiens at the 2014 NHL Entry Draft. When he signed his entry level contract, Audette became the first Sherbrooke Phoenix draftee to sign a professional contract with the National Hockey League.

Professional
During the 2018–19 season, Audette played on multiple lines throughout the Rocket lineup. In the final year of his contract, he played first-line centre, left wing, and third-line centre throughout the season. At the end of the season, the Montreal Canadiens would not offer him a new contract. Audette eventually signed a contract with the Springfield Thunderbirds on September 13, 2019.

Having competed in five seasons in the AHL, Audette opted to pause his North American career and sign his first contract abroad, agreeing to a one-year contract with Finnish Liiga club, Lukko, on May 28, 2020. In his debut European season, Audette enjoyed a standout 2020–21 campaign, recording a professional best with 37 assists and 50 points in 60 regular season games. He continued with 4 helpers in 11 post-season games to help Lukko claim their first Finnish championship.

As a free agent from Lukko, Audette continued his career abroad in agreeing to a one-year contract with Russian based club, HC Vityaz of the KHL, on June 1, 2021.

Personal life
Audette's father Donald Audette was a forward for the Canadiens.

Career statistics

Regular season and playoffs

International

Awards and honours

References

External links

1996 births
Living people
Canadian ice hockey centres
Lausanne HC players
Laval Rocket players
Lukko players
Montreal Canadiens draft picks
Örebro HK players
St. John's IceCaps players
Sherbrooke Phoenix players
Springfield Thunderbirds players
HC Vityaz players